Variety Lights is a 1951 Italian romantic drama film produced, directed and written by Federico Fellini and Alberto Lattuada and starring Peppino De Filippo, Carla Del Poggio, and Giulietta Masina. The film is about a beautiful and ambitious young woman who joins a traveling troupe of third-rate vaudevillians and inadvertently causes jealousy and emotional crises. A collaboration with Alberto Lattuada in production, direction, and writing, Variety Lights launched Fellini's directorial career. Prior to this film, Fellini worked primarily as a screenwriter, most notably working on Roberto Rossellini’s Rome, Open City.

Plot
The filmdancers and performers struggle to make money from town to town, playing to minimal crowds, while the ageing manager of the company falls in love with a newcomer, to the chagrin of his faithful mistress Melina Amour, played by Fellini's real-life wife, Giulietta Masina.  The movie begins with a sold-out vaudeville show in a small Italian town.  A young woman, Liliana, played by Carla Del Poggio, sits in the appreciate crowd, enraptured by the performers.  That evening, as the troupe boards a train, with two of the performers forced to sit in the train toilet to evade paying the fare, the young woman also boards the train.  During the night, she unsuccessfully requests the head of the group, Checco Dal Monte, played by Peppino De Filippo, to join the group.  In the morning when the group realizes it does not have enough money to pay for a carriage, Liliana hires the carriage with the last of her money.  This saves the group several miles of walking and leads to them accepting her.

At the performance that evening, a sparse and hostile crowd mocks each performer in turn.  When the local promoter notices that the crowd responds approvingly to Liliana, he interrupts the performance and directs the group to feature the newcomer.  This leads to repeat performances over the next two days to increasingly larger crowds.  After the third and final performance, a local wealthy man invites the group to his mansion for dinner.  That night Checco realizes he desires Liliana.  In the morning, as the group walks towards the train station, Checco abandons his mistress Melina to walk alone with Liliana.

When the group arrives in Rome, Checco leaves it in order to form his own troupe featuring Liliana. Desperate for money, he visits his old troupe and begs Melina for the funds to launch his show. Stricken, she hands him money and orders him to never contact her again. Checco takes the money triumphantly, but as this new group practices, Liliana arrives to tell him she has signed with a competitor.  Checco collapses.  The movie then follows Liliana in her brilliant debut in a minor role, hinting that she has a bright future ahead of her.  The movie ends with Liliana, sporting an expensive fur coat, boarding a first-class train carriage en route to Milan.  On the adjoining track, Checco and his old troupe board a train for Foggia.

In the final scene, the two trains leave the station as Checco, reunited with Melina, begins to flirt with a young woman who sits across the aisle from him.  This suggests he is about to begin the cycle once again.

Cast
 Peppino De Filippo as Checco Dal Monte
 Carla Del Poggio as Liliana 'Lily' Antonelli
 Giulietta Masina as Melina Amour
 John Kitzmiller as Trumpet player Johnny
 Folco Lulli as Adelmo Conti
 Dante Maggio as Remo
 Checco Durante as Theater Owner
 Gina Mascetti as Valeria del Sole
 Giulio Calì as Magician Edison Will
 Carlo Romano as Enzo La Rosa
 Silvio Bagolini as Bruno Antonini
 Giacomo Furia as Duke
 Mario De Angelis as Maestro
 Vanja Orico as Gypsy Singer
 Enrico Piergentili as Melina's Father
 Renato Malavasi as Hotelkeeper
 Joseph Falletta as Pistolero Bill
 Fanny Marchiò as Soubrette

Production
Filming locations
 Capranica, Lazio, Italy
 Rome, Lazio, Italy

References

External links
 
 
Variety Lights an essay by Andrew Sarris at the Criterion Collection

1951 films
1951 romantic drama films
Italian romantic drama films
1950s Italian-language films
Films about entertainers
Films about musical theatre
Films directed by Federico Fellini
Films directed by Alberto Lattuada
Films with screenplays by Federico Fellini
1951 directorial debut films
Italian black-and-white films
1950s Italian films